Auricularia angiospermarum  (wood ear or tree ear) is a species of fungus in the family Auriculariaceae. Basidiocarps (fruitbodies) are gelatinous, ear-like, and grow on dead wood of broadleaf trees. It is a North American species and was formerly confused with Auricularia auricula-judae which is confined to Europe.

Taxonomy 
The species was originally described in 2015 from Connecticut on a fallen oak trunk. It had previously been referred to Auricularia americana 'deciduous unit', but additional molecular research, based on cladistic analysis of DNA sequences, has shown that Auricularia angiospermarum is a distinct species.

Description 
The fruitbodies occur singly or in clusters. The upper surface is finely pilose. The spore-bearing underside is smooth.

Microscopic characters 
The microscopic characters are typical of the genus Auricularia. The basidia are tubular, laterally septate, 45–65 × 3.5–5 µm. The spores are allantoid (sausage-shaped), 13–15 × 5–5.5 µm.

Similar species 
In North America, Auricularia americana is almost identical but grows on conifer wood. On wood of broadleaf trees, Auricularia fuscosuccinea occurs in southern North America and typically has cinnamon-brown to purplish-brown fruitbodies. Auricularia nigricans is also southern, but has a densely pilose upper surface.

Habitat and distribution 
Auricularia angiospermarum is a wood-rotting species, typically found on dead attached or fallen wood of broadleaf trees. It is widely distributed in North America, but is not currently known elsewhere.

References 

Auriculariales
Fungi of North America
Fungi described in 2015
Taxa named by Yu-Cheng Dai